The Courtyard is a theatre housed in the former public library (originally known as the Passmore Edwards Free Library) in Pitfield Street in Hoxton, London Borough of Hackney, England. It is a Grade II listed building.

The Courtyard operates both a 150-seat main house and an 80-seat studio theatre. It is also home to the Iambic wine bar.

The Courtyard hosted the first London Horror Festival in October/November 2011, a co-production between The Courtyard and Theatre of the Damned, the UK's first festival of horror in the performing arts.

The Courtyard benefits from its location in Hoxton, which is one of London's most exciting creative districts. It is consistently in demand as a venue for emerging artists to present their work.

The Courtyard is home to its own theatre company known as Court Theatre Training Company. A drama school that is accredited by Bucks New Uni.

References

Theatres in the London Borough of Hackney
Grade II listed buildings in the London Borough of Hackney